"Time, Real and Imaginary. An Allegory" is a short poem of 11 lines written by Samuel Taylor Coleridge at an uncertain date, and first published in 1817.

Text 
The poem was first published in Sibylline Leaves, 1817, in the preliminary matter. It was included in the 1828, 1829, and 1834 editions of Coleridge's poetry. The date of composition is uncertain, although Ernest Hartley Coleridge gives .

Analysis 
In the 'Preface' to Sibylline Leaves, p. iii, an apology is offered for the insertion of the poem on the plea that it was a 'school boy poem' added 'at the request of the friends of my youth'. The title is explained as follows:—'By imaginary Time, I meant the state of a school boy's mind when on his return to school he projects his being in his day dreams, and lives in his next holidays, six months hence; and this I contrasted with real Time.'  

In a Notebook of  there is an attempt to analyse and illustrate the 'sense of Time', which appears to have been written before the lines as published in Sibylline Leaves took shape:

References

Bibliography 

 Coleridge: E. H., ed. (1895). Anima Poetæ: From the Unpublished Note-books of Samuel Taylor Coleridge. London: William Heinemann. pp. 241–243. 
 Coleridge, E. H., ed. (1912). The Complete Poetical Works of Samuel Taylor Coleridge. Vol. 1. Oxford: Clarendon Press. 

British poems
1817 poems
Poetry by Samuel Taylor Coleridge